The Broadcasting Act 1989 creates a system of broadcasting standards and the Broadcasting Commission to fund public broadcasting and New Zealand independent producers.

It established the Broadcasting Standards Authority which oversees the broadcasting standards regime in New Zealand. It is an independent Crown entity and therefore the New Zealand Government cannot directly influence its work although it can provide high-level guidance.

The act also establishes NZ On Air, formally the Broadcasting Commission, which funds public broadcasting and independent media production in New Zealand. NZ On Air was originally created to encourage payment of the  Public Broadcasting Fee, which was abolished in 1999. Since then, the commission has received its funding directly from the Ministry for Culture and Heritage.

Part 6 sets out the law covering election advertising on radio and television by parties and electorate candidates, the allocation of time and money to political parties for this purpose by the Electoral Commission, and the requirements for broadcasters to supply returns of election advertising.

See also 
 NZ On Air
 Broadcasting Standards Authority

References

External links 
 Broadcasting Act 1989
 NZ On Air website 
 Broadcasting Standards Authority website

Law of New Zealand